Cape Spencer Light may refer to:
Cape Spencer Light (Alaska) at the entrance to Cross Sound
Cape Spencer Light (New Brunswick) on the Bay of Fundy
Cape Spencer Lighthouse (South Australia) at the south west tip of Yorke Peninsula.

See also
Cape Spencer (disambiguation)